Agnès Raharolahy (born 7 November 1992) is a French athlete specialising in the 400 metres and 800 metres. She won the bronze medal in the 800 m at the 2023 European Indoor Championships. Raharolahy earned five major medals in the 4 × 400 m relays.

She won two French indoor titles (400 m, 800 m).

Raharolahy is of Malagasy descent.

Statistics

Competition record

1Time from the heats; Raharolahy was replaced in the final.

Personal bests
 400 metres – 52.23 (Geneva 2015)
 400 metres indoor – 52.57 (Miramas 2019)
 800 metres – 1:59.59 (Caen 2022)
 800 metres indoor – 2:00.83 (Val-de-Reuil 2023)

National titles
 French Indoor Athletics Championships
 400 metres: 2017
 800 metres: 2022

References

External links

 

French female sprinters
1992 births
Living people
Sportspeople from Alençon
French sportspeople of Malagasy descent
European Athletics Championships medalists
World Athletics Championships athletes for France
Mediterranean Games silver medalists for France
Mediterranean Games bronze medalists for France
Mediterranean Games medalists in athletics
Athletes (track and field) at the 2013 Mediterranean Games
Athletes (track and field) at the 2018 Mediterranean Games
21st-century French women